The Oberon railway line is a short, disused branch railway line on the Central Tablelands of New South Wales, Australia. The line branches from the Main Western line at Tarana railway station and heads in a southerly direction to Oberon railway station, with  length of 24 km. It was earlier put forward as a line from Tarana to Burraga, via Oberon, to benefit the Burraga copper mine. It opened on 3 October 1923, after the copper mine at Burraga had closed down. The line was lightly constructed with steep grades (1 in 25) and tight curves, and was operated by lightweight steam and then diesel locomotives. It transported local seasonal vegetables, timber and livestock. Passenger services ended in 1971, and goods services were suspended in 1979 with the line effectively closing. The line is currently being restored by a volunteer association to allow heritage and tourist operation.

The early history of the line is contained in an article appearing in Australian Railway Historical Society Bulletin, July, 1958.

Preservation efforts
Since 2007, the Oberon Tarana Heritage Railway Inc (OTHR) have been steadily restoring the track between Oberon station and Hazelgrove. Two end platform carriages (on loan from NSWRTM) and some smaller wagons have been delivered and are on the tracks in Oberon station. Two 73 class diesel locos have moved and CPH 13 is awaiting shipment to Oberon to form the OTHR's motive power. It is the long-term goal of the association to run trains all the way to the mainline at Tarana.

See also

 Rail transport in New South Wales

References

Closed regional railway lines in New South Wales
Standard gauge railways in Australia
Railway lines opened in 1923
Railway lines closed in 1979
Oberon Council
1923 establishments in Australia